Cornelia Travnicek (born 1987 in St. Pölten, Lower Austria) is an Austrian writer who has published several books and stories.

Life
Travnicek lives in Lower Austria, Austria. She studied Sinology and Informatics at the University of Vienna and works part-time as a researcher for the VRVis Zentrum für Virtual Reality und Visualisierung. Some of her work has been translated to English, Spanish, Italian, Polish and Serbian. She is represented by the Simon Literary Agency.

List of works
 Chucks - 2012 , 
 Fütter mich (Feed me) - 2009. , 
 Die Asche meiner Schwester (The ashes of my sister) - 2008
 Aurora Borealis - 2008 , 
 spannung spiel und schokolade (live play and chocolate) - 2008
 Junge Hunde (young dogs) - 2015

Awards 
 Recognition Award of the State of Lower Austria (Category Literature) 2012
 Audience Award at the German Literature Days 2012
 Lise-Meitner Literature Prize 2009
 3rd Place at FM4 wording 2009
 Theodor-Körner Award 2008
 Marlen Haushofer Prize 2007
 Hans Weigel Literature Scholarship for 2006/2007
 Youngster of Arts award from the city of St. Pölten 2006
 2nd Place at FM4 wording 2006
 Prize for young writers at "writing between cultures" club-exile 2005
 "Marianne von Willemer" Award - Literature Prize 2005
 Audience Award at Hattinger Award for Young Literature 2004

References

See also
 Cornelia Travnicek Official Website

Austrian women writers
Living people
1987 births